Andrzej Busza  (born 1938, Poland), Polish Canadian poet, translator, essayist. Associated Professor Emeritus of the University of British Columbia in Vancouver.
After the outbreak of the World War II, his family fled through Romania to Palestine where they stayed until 1947, when they settled in England. Andrzej Busza studied there in London (St. Joseph's College and University College London of the University of London). Soon he became active in Polish émigré literary circles. In 1965 he moved to Canada where for many years he taught English literature on University of British Columbia.

Busza's major contribution to the study of English literature comes mainly from his work on Joseph Conrad life and literary achievements, including Busza's translations from Polish literature. He is an honorary member of the Polish Historical Institute in Rome and  International Association of University Professors of English. His first published poems appeared in London's Polish literary periodical "Kontynenty" in the 1950s.

Books of poetry 

 Znaki wodne, Paris, 1969
 Astrologer in the Underground, translated from Polish by Michael Bullock and J. Boraks, Ohio, 1979
 Głosy i refleksje, translated from English by B. Czaykowski, Berlin, 2001
 Scenes from the life of Laquedem, Toronto/Berlin, 2003, 

Many individual poems, essays and translations by Busza appeared in literary, cultural and academic journals, i.e.: Kultura (Paris), Fraza (Rzeszów), Strumien (Vancouver), Akcenty (Lublin), and others.

References 

Polish poets
20th-century Canadian poets
20th-century Canadian male writers
Canadian male poets
21st-century Canadian poets
Living people
1938 births
Academic staff of the University of British Columbia
Alumni of University College London
Polish emigrants to Canada
Writers from British Columbia
21st-century Canadian male writers